The 1808–09 United States Senate elections were held on various dates in various states, coinciding with the 1808 presidential election. As these U.S. Senate elections were prior to the ratification of the Seventeenth Amendment in 1913, senators were chosen by state legislatures. Senators were elected over a wide range of time throughout 1808 and 1809, and a seat may have been filled months late or remained vacant due to legislative deadlock. In these elections, terms were up for the senators in Class 1.

The Federalist Party gained one seat in these elections. The Federalists had gone into the elections with such a small share of Senate seats (6 out of 34, or 18%) that even if they had won every election, they would have still remained a minority caucus.

Results summary 
Senate party division, 11th Congress (1809–1811)

 Majority party: Democratic-Republican (26)
 Minority party: Federalist (7–8)
 Other parties: 0
 Total seats: 34

Change in composition

Before the regular elections

Result of the regular elections

Race summaries 
Except if/when noted, the number following candidates is the whole number vote(s), not a percentage.

Special elections during the preceding Congress 
In these special elections, the winner was elected during 1808 or before March 4, 1809; ordered by election date.

Races leading to the next Congress 
In these regular elections, the winner was seated on March 4, 1809; ordered by state.

All of the elections involved the Class 1 seats.

Special elections during the next Congress 
In this special election, the winner was elected in 1809 after March 4; ordered by election date.

Early race leading to the Congress-after-next 
In this regular election, the winner was seated on March 4, 1811; ordered by state.

This election involved a Class 2 seat.

Connecticut

Delaware

Georgia (special)

Maryland 

Samuel Smith was appointed to the seat as opposed to a re-election, due to the State House and State Senate unable to come to an agreement on how to elect a Senator.

Samuel Smith then won re-election over John Eager Howard by a margin of 27.59%, or 24 votes, for the Class 1 seat.

Massachusetts

Massachusetts (regular)

Massachusetts (special)

New Jersey

New Jersey (regular)

New Jersey (special)

New York

Ohio

Ohio (specials)

Pennsylvania

Pennsylvania (regular)

Pennsylvania (special)

Rhode Island

Rhode Island (regular)

Rhode Island (special)

Tennessee

Class 1 
Democratic-Republican Joseph Anderson had served in this and the other Senate seat on-and-off since 1797.

Tennessee (regular, class 1) 

The Tennessee legislature failed to elect a new senator.

The seat would have become vacant at the March 4, 1809 beginning of the term, but the Governor of Tennessee appointed Anderson to begin the term, pending a special election.

Tennessee (special, class 1) 

Anderson was elected April 11, 1809 to finish the term.

Class 2 
Democratic-Republican Daniel Smith was first elected in 1803.

Tennessee (special, class 2) 

Smith resigned March 31, 1809.

Democratic-Republican Jenkin Whiteside was elected April 11, 1809 to finish Smith's term, which would end 1809.

Tennessee (regular, class 2) 

Whiteside was re-elected early October 28, 1809, unopposed.

Vermont

Virginia

See also 
 1808 United States elections
 1808 United States presidential election
 1808–09 United States House of Representatives elections
 10th United States Congress
 11th United States Congress

Notes

External links 
 Party Division in the Senate, 1789-Present, via Senate.gov